Nahshonim (lit. Pioneers) is a kibbutz in central Israel. Located in the south of the Sharon plain near Rosh HaAyin, it falls under the jurisdiction of Drom HaSharon Regional Council.

History
Kibbutz Nahshonim was founded in 1949 by a group largely made up of Egyptian Jewish immigrants and refugees, as well as a few native Israelis. They chose the name, well aware of its roots in the biblical pioneer Nahshon, who helped Moses during the Exodus from Egypt. 

It is well known in Israel for its motor park and the "Nahshonit" entertainment park.

Notable residents
Harel Levy (born 1978), tennis player and Davis Cup team captain
Shalom Cohen (politician)

References

Kibbutzim
Kibbutz Movement
Populated places established in 1949
Populated places in Central District (Israel)
1949 establishments in Israel
Egyptian-Jewish culture in Israel